Sea-Airport Cuxhaven/Nordholz is a joint public and military airport serving Cuxhaven and Northern Germany. It is mainly used for general aviation and cargo traffic as the international seaports of Cuxhaven and Bremerhaven are only a few minutes away.

History
Nordholz is one of the oldest airports in Germany, dating to 17 December 1912. Construction of the airport installations started a year later and was finished in 1914. Until 2016 it was in military use. For the naval airbase, see Nordholz Naval Airbase.

In order to replace Bremerhaven-Luneort Airport effective February 2016 a new Sea-Airpark Cuxhaven/Nordholz was established with an area of up to more than 40ha / 100 acres for industrial or commercial investments offers direct airfield-access and targets aviation-affine as well as other companies looking for cost-effective and clever solutions. The Sea-Airpark is open for a variety of investment-projects dealing with logistics, industrial production, service-facilities or aircraft maintenance.

In November 2016, German leisure airline Germania announced seasonal flights to Palma de Mallorca beginning in September 2017. The first international commercial flight from Cuxhaven, ST6094 by Germania, took place on 29. September 2017. However, after only one operated service, the route has been forbidden indefinitely by the authorities due to unfulfilled safety regulations by the airport.

Facilities
The airport operates a runway with 2.439m x 45m and two 275m overruns. At this time there seems to be a small General Aviation terminal on the South East side, also to be used for scheduled and charter flights. On the other (North West) side of the airport there is Flugplatz Nordholz-Spieka used for private aviation featuring a 875x30m grass runway.

Airlines and destinations

As of May 2021, there are currently no scheduled or charter flights at the airport.

Ground transportation
The airport can be reached via nearby A27 motorway (Nordholz exit) which leads from Bremen to Cuxhaven.
Currently there is no public transportation available, the only way to reach the airport is by car or taxi. The next train station is Nordholz (4 km) being on the train link Bremerhaven-Cuxhaven.

See also
 Nordholz Naval Airbase
 Transport in Germany
 List of airports in Germany

References

External links
 Official website
 
 

Airport
Nordholz